Yanni Live! The Concert Event is the third live album by Yanni. It was recorded live at the Mandalay Bay Events Center, Las Vegas on November 6, 2004, and released in August 2006 as a CD and concert film on DVD.  The album peaked at No. 1 on Billboard's "Top New Age Albums" chart; No. 6 on the "Top Independent Albums" chart; No. 84 on the "Billboard 200" chart; and at No. 84 on the "Top Internet Albums" chart, during the same year.

Critical reception

In a review by Richie Unterberger of AllMusic, "Recorded and filmed for DVD live at the Mandalay Bay Resort & Casino in Las Vegas during Yanni's 2005 world tour, this 65-minute set delivers what you'd expect from a live Yanni album: an eclectic, cinematic fusion of world, new age, and mainstream contemporary pop styles. The 13 songs are, with one exception, drawn from releases dating back to the 1980s ("Keys to the Imagination" having been the title track of his 1986 album) all the way up to the most recent studio effort predating this recording, 2003's Ethnicity (from which three songs are presented)."

Track listing – Album
"Rainmaker" – 5:20
"Keys to Imagination" – 5:22
"Enchantment" – 4:06
"Standing in Motion" – 1:38
"On Sacred Ground" – (McNeill, Yanni) – 7:56
"Playtime" – 7:08
"Until the Last Moment" – 6:36
"If I Could Tell You" – 4:19
"For All Seasons" – 8:14
"The Storm" – 5:07  (based on Antonio Vivaldi's 18th century violin concerto "Summer" from The Four Seasons)
"Prelude" – 5:21
"Nostalgia" – 4:31

Track listing – Video
"Standing in Motion"
"Rainmaker"
"Keys to Imagination"
"Enchantment"
"On Sacred Ground"
"Playtime"
"Until the Last Moment"
"If I Could Tell You"
"For All Seasons"
"The Storm"
"Prelude"
"Nostalgia"
"World Dance"

Personnel
Yanni  (Greece) – Piano, Keyboards

Band
Charlie Adams (USA) – drums
Victor Espinola (Paraguay) – harp, vocals
Pedro Eustache (Venezuela) – flute, saxophone, duduk, whistle, bansuri
Ramon Flores (Mexico) – trumpet
Ming Freeman (Taiwan) – keyboards
David Hudson (Australia) – didgeridoo
Hussain Jiffry (Sri Lanka) – bass guitar
Sayaka Katsuki (Japan) – violin
Dan Landrum (USA) – hammered dulcimer
Armen Movsessian (Armenia) – violin
Walter Rodriguez (Puerto Rico) – percussion
Samvel Yervinyan (Armenia) – violin

Vocalists
Alfreda Gerald (USA)
Michelle Amato (USA)

Orchestra
Kristen Autry (USA) – violin
April Cap (USA) – oboe
Zachary Carrettin (USA) – violin
Ilona Geller (Ukraine) – viola
Kerry Hughes (USA) – trumpet
Jim Mattos (USA) – French horn
Eugene Mechtovich (USA) – viola
Kristin Morrison (USA) – French horn
Sarah O'Brien (England) – cello
Dana Teboe (USA) – trombone
Erika Walczak (USA) – violin
Alexander Zhiroff (Russia) – cello

"Yanni Live!" tour dates

Production
Executive producer: Yanni
Directed by Jerry McReynolds & George Veras.
Remote and Mobile Production Facilities PMTV

References

External links
Official Website

Yanni Live! The Concert Event at AllMovie

Concert films
Yanni live albums
Yanni video albums
Yanni concert tours
2006 live albums
Live instrumental albums
Live albums recorded in the Las Vegas Valley